"Nothing from Nothing" is a song written by Billy Preston and Bruce Fisher and recorded by Billy Preston for his 1974 album The Kids & Me. The song reached #1 on the Billboard Hot 100 chart for one week in October 1974, becoming Preston's second solo chart-topper in the United States (following his 1973 hit "Will It Go Round in Circles"). It spent four and a half months on the chart.

Preston performed "Nothing from Nothing" on Saturday Night Live, the first musical performance ever on the show.

The song was also used in late 2002 for all GM brand commercials and was also prominently featured in both the 1975 low-budget independent bank-heist caper "Flash and the Firecat" and the 2008 film Be Kind Rewind.

Chart performance

Weekly charts

Year-end charts

Cover versions
Alternative rock band Lazlo Bane covered the song for their 2007 cover album Guilty Pleasures.

The artist Mac Miller covered the song for his 2018 Spotify session. This single was released posthumously.

The Billy Preston version is featured in Season 2 of South Park in episode 6, "The Mexican Staring Frog of Southern Sri Lanka," during a fictional interview of Bob Denver on the talk show, Jesus and Pals.

American folk band The Ghost of Paul Revere released a cover single, as well as the opening song to their 2019 album Field Notes, Vol. 2.

References

External links
 

1974 singles
Billy Preston songs
Billboard Hot 100 number-one singles
Cashbox number-one singles
RPM Top Singles number-one singles
Songs written by Billy Preston
Songs written by Bruce Fisher
1974 songs
A&M Records singles